Taningia danae, the Dana octopus squid, is a species of squid in the family Octopoteuthidae.

Taningia danae is named after Danish fisheries biologist Åge Vedel Tåning (1890–1958), who often traveled on the research vessel Dana.

Ecology
Taningia danae possesses bioluminescence, like other octopoteuthids. Its photophores are some of the largest such organs known to science, the organs being compared in size to fists or lemons. They possess a black membrane over the photophore that may conceal the organs, allowing the squid to blink its lights; this membrane has been compared to eyelids as a result.

In 2005, a Japanese research team headed by Tsunemi Kubodera managed to film T. danae in its natural habitat for the first time. The video footage, shot in deep water off Chichi-jima in the northern Pacific Ocean, shows T. danae emitting blinding flashes of light from photophores on its arms as it attacks its prey. It is believed that this highly maneuverable squid uses the bright flashes to disorient potential prey. These flashes may also serve to illuminate the prey to make for easier capture as well as a courtship and territorial display.

As well as a predatorial characteristic, T. danae bioluminescence has also been suggested to be a defense mechanism. Juveniles of this species have been observed moving rapidly in the direction of potential predators, as if hunting, to disorient and startle the threat with a mock attack.

In 2012, T. danae was filmed twice more during a search for the giant squid for the Discovery Channel Special, Monster Squid: The Giant Is Real.

Remains of T. danae have, on occasion, been found washed ashore on beaches. In 2008, a mantle of T. danae was discovered by students in Bermuda's Grape Bay, while tentacle remnants were found farther along the shore. It was loaned to the Spanish Institute of Oceanography.

15N ratios showed that this squid is a top predator. In turn, they are eaten by the sperm whale.

Notes

References

Further reading
 González, Á.F., Á. Guerra & F. Rocha 2003. New data on the life history and ecology of the deep-sea hooked squid Taningia danae. Sarsia 88(4): 297–301.
 Quetglas, A., K. Fliti, E. Massutí, W. Refes, B. Guijarro & S. Zaghdoudi 2006. . Scientia Marina 70(1): 153–155.
 Santos, M.B., G.J. Pierce, Á.F. González, F. Santos, M.A. Vázquez, M.A. Santos & M.A. Collins 2001. First records of Taningia danae (Cephalopoda: Octopoteuthidae) in Galician waters (north-west Spain) and in Scottish waters (UK). Journal of the Marine Biological Association of the UK 81(2): 355–356. 
 Zeidler, W. 1981. A giant deep-sea squid, Taningia sp., from South Australian waters. Transactions of the Royal Society of South Australia 105(4): 218.

External links

Tree of Life web project: Taningia danae
National Geographic: Monster Glowing Squid Caught on Camera
BBC: Large squid lights up for attack

See also
 Giant squid
 Giant squid in popular culture

Squid
Molluscs of the Pacific Ocean
Molluscs described in 1931